Danylo Olehovych Udod (born 9 March 2004) is a Ukrainian professional footballer who plays as a defender for Al Ain, on loan from Shakhtar Donetsk.

Career
Born in Donetsk, Udod began his career in the local FC Shakhtar youth sportive school.

He played in the Ukrainian Premier League Reserves and never made his debut for the Shakhtar Donetsk senior squad. In July 2021 he went on loan to Ukrainian Premier League side FC Mariupol, making his debut as a substitute against Zorya Luhansk on 22 August 2021.

References

External links
 

2004 births
Living people
Footballers from Donetsk
Ukrainian footballers
FC Shakhtar Donetsk players
FC Mariupol players
Al Ain FC players
Association football defenders
Ukrainian Premier League players
Ukraine youth international footballers
Ukrainian expatriate footballers
Expatriate footballers in the United Arab Emirates
Ukrainian expatriate sportspeople in the United Arab Emirates